Eltville am Rhein (from Alta Villa, Latin for "high estate, high town", corrupted to Eldeville, Elfeld and later Eltville) is a town in the Rheingau-Taunus-Kreis in the Regierungsbezirk of Darmstadt in Hesse, Germany. It lies on the German Timber-Frame Road.

Eltville is the biggest town in the Rheingau. It bears the nicknames Weinstadt, Sektstadt, Rosenstadt and since 2006 also Gutenbergstadt. Some of Germany's most famous vineyards (Steinberg, Rauenthaler Baiken, Erbacher Marcobrunn) are found within Eltville's municipal limits.

Geography

Location 
Eltville, which belongs culturally to the Rheingau region, lies on the River Rhine, 12 km west-southwest of Wiesbaden.

Neighbouring municipalities 
Eltville borders in the north on the municipalities of Schlangenbad and Kiedrich, in the east on the district-free city of Wiesbaden and the municipality of Walluf, in the south – separated by the Rhine – on the municipalities of Budenheim und Heidesheim and the town of Ingelheim (all three in Mainz-Bingen in Rhineland-Palatinate) and in the west on the town of Oestrich-Winkel.

Territorial structure 
Eltville am Rhein as a municipality consists of five Stadtteile:
 Eltville (initial part and center)
 Erbach
 Hattenheim
 Martinsthal
 Rauenthal
All of them have the status as an Ortsbezirk.

History 
The earliest traces of humans settling here go back to the New Stone Age. There has been continuous habitation since the late 4th century. Eltville had its first documentary mention in Vita Bardonis (Bardo's life) from 1058, a biography of Archbishop Bardo of Mainz. In 1329, the archiepiscopal castle and the town wall around Eltville were built. On 23 August 1332, Emperor Louis the Bavarian granted Eltville town rights. With the granting of town rights, Eltville ended up being a pawn in the then ongoing dispute between the Emperor and the Pope. Archbishop Baldwin, one of Emperor Louis's followers and administrator of the Mainz monastery, was the one who asked for Eltville to be raised to town. From 1347 to 1480, Eltville was the residence of the Archbishops of Mainz. In 1349, Günther of Schwarzburg was defeated in his bid for the German throne at the Siege of Eltville. From Dietrich Schenk von Erbach, Archbishop of Mainz (1434–1459), the outlying centre of Erbach presumably got its name.

Politics

Town council

The municipal election held on 26 March 2006 yielded the following results:

Town partnerships
The town of Eltville am Rhein maintains partnerships with these places:
 Montrichard, Loir-et-Cher, France
 Arzens, Aude, France
 Passignano sul Trasimeno, Perugia, Umbria, Italy

Culture and sightseeing

Buildings

 Electoral castle from the 14th century, with a rose garden
 Remains of town fortifications
 timber-frame from the 16th and 18th centuries
 Eberbach Cistercian monastery
 Clos of the Steinberg, Germany's best known clos (small, enclosed vineyard)
 Schloss Reinhartshausen (palace)
 St. Peter's and Paul's parish church from the 14th century
 Pfarrkirche St. Markus (St. Mark's parish church) in Erbach from the 15th century and the Evangelical church in Erbach from the 19th century.
 Kulturkirche Martinsthal (culture church)
 Crass Castle

Regular events
 Gutenberg-Winter in Eltville – each year in January and February
 Rheingauer Schlemmerwoche (gluttons' week) and Days of Open Wine Cellars with many wine samplings – late April/early May
 Rosentage in Eltville (rose days) – each year on the first weekend in June
 Erdbeerfest in Erbach (strawberry festival) – each year in mid-June
 Sektfest Eltville – each year on the first weekend in July
 Martinsthaler Weinfest – always on the second weekend in July
 Rheingau Musik Festival – International Music Festival, in summer
 Rauenthaler Weinfest – on the second or third weekend in August
 Burghofspiele – in summer
 Kappeskerb/Weinlesefest in Eltville (kermis/wine harvest festival) – each year on the last weekend in October
 Rheingau Pokal ("cup" in taekwondo, fighting) – each year in mid-November
 Musikalischer Winter in Eltville – each year on each Thursday from mid-November to late April
 Christmas Market in the Old Town – on the second weekend in December.

Economy and infrastructure

Economy and tourism
Eltville is developed for  tourists, and well known for its wine and sekt production, which can be sampled at many wineries and Straußwirtschaften (seasonal wine shops).  Eltville is the headquarters of MM-Sektkellerei (which today belongs to Rotkäppchen-Sekt), Hessische Staatsweingüter Kloster Eberbach (Hessian State Wine Estates of Eberbach Monastery), and Sektmanufaktur Schloss Vaux, as well as the biggest industrial employer in the Rheingau, Jean Müller GmbH Elektrotechnische Fabrik. Eltville is one of Germany's ten "Rosenstädte" (rose towns).

Transport
Eltville lies on Bundesstraße 42, which towards the east is built like an Autobahn and near Walluf seamlessly joins the A 66. Eltville station also lies on the East Rhine Railway, which connects Frankfurt and Wiesbaden to Koblenz and Cologne and belongs to the Rhein-Main-Verkehrsverbund. On the Rhine's bank are several landing stages for, among others, the Köln-Düsseldorfer Deutsche Rheinschiffahrt, a well known Rhine passenger ship operator.

Education
 Freiherr-vom-Stein-Schule (primary school in the main town)
 Gutenberg-Schule (Realschule in the main town)
 Gymnasium Eltville (in the main town)
 Sonnenblumenschule (primary school in Erbach)
 Waldbachschule (primary school in Hattenheim)
 Otfried-Preußler-Schule (primary school in Rauenthal)
 Mediathek Eltville (public municipal library)
 IREBS Immobilier Akademie, Real Estate Management academy situated in Kloster Eberbach

Notable people
Johannes Gutenberg was named on 17 January 1465 a courtly nobleman by the Archbishop and Elector Adolph II of Nassau, who at the time resided in the Electoral castle at Eltville. Presumably under Gutenberg's guidance, the Brothers Bechtermünz founded a small printing shop. This published in 1467 the Vocabularius ex quo, a Latin dictionary. In this workshop, Thomas Aquinas's Summa de articulis fidei (1472) was also reprinted. This made Eltville one of the cradle towns of book printing. In the castle tower, a memorial recalls Gutenberg. Gutenberg's brother, Friele Gensfleisch, lived in Eltville from 1434 until his death in 1447. The Gensfleisch-Haus still stands today right next to the castle.
Gebeno von Eberbach, clergyman
Julius Koch (28 February 1912, Frankfurt2 July 1991, Eltville), German drink researcher, oenologist and food chemist.
Georg Herber (1763–1833 in Eltville), for many years President of the second chamber of The Estates of Duchy of Nassau

Sons and daughters of the town
Michael Apitz (born 1965), graphic and comic strip artist
Franz Josef Jung (born 1949), German politician (CDU) and Federal Minister of Defence in the first Merkel cabinet
Augustinus Kilian (1856–1930 in Limburg an der Lahn) was from 1913 until his death in 1930 Roman Catholic Bishop of the Bishopric of Limburg an der Lahn.
Heinrich Köppler (1925–1980), German politician (CDU), candidate at the Landtag election in North Rhine-Westphalia, 1980.
Wilhelm Kreis (1873–1955), architect
Eduard Kremer (1881–1948), politician
Ernst Freiherr Langwerth von Simmern (1865–1942), German diplomat, ambassador in Madrid and Imperial commissar for the occupied Rhenish areas in Koblenz
Ferdinand Wilhelm Emil Roth (1853–1924), historical researcher
Andreas Scholl (born 1967), countertenor
Bernhard Schott (1748–1809), music publisher, founded the music publishing house Schott Music in Mainz in 1770
 Jennifer Braun (born 1991), singer, lives in Eltville

Photo gallery

References

External links

 
Hattenheim 
Rheingau Daily Photo Blog 
 
Image of Elfeld (today Eltville) from J.F. Dielmann, A. Fay, J. Becker (illustrators): Panorama of the Rhine – View of the right and left bank of the Rhine, Lithographische Anstalt F. C. Vogel, Frankfurt 1833

Populated places on the Rhine
Rheingau-Taunus-Kreis
Rheingau